Madame Manet at the Piano  is a portrait by Édouard Manet of his wife Suzanne (née Leenhoff), produced in 1867-68 and now in the Musée d'Orsay in Paris. It highlights her talent on the piano - she played Wagner to Baudelaire during his last days.

Presentation 
Before the advent of the radio and the gramophone, music lovers had to play their own pieces using sheet music. The piano in particular was a particularly popular instrument for this. It is estimated that around 1860 there were about 20,000 piano teachers active in Paris. In 1849 Manet's father appointed Suzanne Leenhoff as piano teacher for his sons. She was a gifted interpreter of composers such as Schumann and Wagner. When the poet Charles Baudelaire suffers a stroke in 1866 and ends up in a Paris hospital, she offers him a distraction by playing Wagner. A love affair develops between Leenhoff and Manet, which will eventually be sealed with a marriage in 1863.

In 1868 Edgar Degas had made a painting of the Manet couple with Suzanne at the piano and her husband listening on the couch. Degas gave the canvas to Manet as a present. However, the latter was so dissatisfied with the way his wife had been portrayed that he cut off part of the canvas. Then he painted his own version. Suzanne Manet wears a stylish black dress on this. Manet chose a relatively high vantage point for this painting so that her hands are clearly visible. In the top right corner a small still life is visible in the mirror, including a clock and a pair of candlesticks. This lends depth and vibrancy to the flat background.

References

1867 paintings
1868 paintings
Paintings in the collection of the Musée d'Orsay
Manet
Manet
Musical instruments in art